Tisci is an Italian surname. Notable people with the surname include:

 Ivan Tisci (born 1974), Italian footballer
 Riccardo Tisci (born 1974), Italian fashion designer

Italian-language surnames